Sioux Lookout railway station is located in the town of Sioux Lookout, Kenora District in northwestern Ontario, Canada. The station is on the Canadian National Railway transcontinental main line; it is used by Via Rail and served by transcontinental Canadian trains. Via Rail uses a heated shack near the historic station building.

References

External links

Via Rail stations in Ontario
Sioux Lookout
Railway stations in Kenora District
Designated heritage railway stations in Ontario
Designated heritage properties in Ontario
Canadian National Railway stations in Ontario